Steindór Andersen (born 1954) is an Icelandic musician.

Steindór is noted for his Rímur chanting and is most widely known for his collaborations with the band  Sigur Rós. Other collaborations include with Hilmar Örn Hilmarsson and rapper Erpur Eyvindarson.

Discography
 2001: Rímur EP (featuring Sigur Rós)
 2002: Rímur & Rapp (joint with Hilmar Örn Hilmarsson and Erpur Eyvindarson
 2003: Rímur
 2004: Úlfhamsrímur
 2013: Stafnbúi (joint with Hilmar Örn Hilmarsson)

Appearances
After the Folk Music Festival in Siglufjörður, July 2007, where Steindór is a regular guest, another guest musician at the festival, Evan Harlan of the group Andromeda, impressed with Steindór's chanting of the rímur, composed the piece "Steindór Gets the Blues". The music was premiered in Boston, the home of the Icelandic-American group, later the same month.

Steindór also appears on Sigur Rós's 2007 DVD release, Heima, performing "Hugann seiða svalli frá" from Rímur.

Filmography
 2005: Screaming Masterpiece

Personal life
Steindór also works as a fisherman, captaining his ship the Iðunn.

Notes

External links
 

1954 births
Living people
20th-century Icelandic male singers
21st-century Icelandic male singers